Mattheus Pinna da Encarnaçao (23 August 1687 – 18 December 1764) was a Brazilian Benedictine writer and theologian.

Life
He was born at Rio de Janeiro.  On 3 March 1703, he became a Benedictine at the Abbey of Nossa Senhora do Montserrate at Rio de Janeiro, where he also studied the humanities and philosophy under . After studying theology at the monastery of Bahia, he was ordained priest 24 March 1708, and appointed professor of philosophy and theology.

He escaped to Portugal, became very influential at Court and was restored to his monastery by Cardinal  in 1729. He held the office of abbot repeatedly thereafter; both at Rio de Janeiro (1729–31 and 1739) and at Bahia in 1746. In 1732 he was elected provincial abbot, in which capacity he visited the distant monasteries of Brazil, despite the difficulty of travel. He was again elected provincial abbot in 1752, but this time he declined, preferring to spend his old age in prayer and retirement. He died in Rio de Janeiro.

Works

His works are:

"Defensio S. Matris Ecclesiæ" (Lisbon, 1729), an extensive treatise on grace and free will against Quesnel, Baius, Jansenius, etc.; 
"Viridario Evangelico" (Lisbon, 1730–37), four volumes of sermons on the Gospels; 
"Theologia Scholastica Dogmatica", in six volumes, which he did not complete entirely nor was it published.

References

Attribution
 The entry cites:
Dietario do Mosteiro de N. S. do Montserrate do Rio de Janeiro, preserved in Manuscript at the Monastery Library of Rio de Janeiro, 69-74, 312-18; 
RAMIZ GALVÃO, Apontamentos historicos sobre a Ordem Benedictino em general, e em particular sobre o Mosteiro de N. S. do Monserrate do Rio de Janeiro in Revista Trimensal do Instituto historico, geographico e ethnographico do Brasil (Rio de Janeiro, 1872), 249 sq.

1687 births
1764 deaths
Brazilian Benedictines
Benedictine abbots
Brazilian Roman Catholic theologians
Benedictine theologians